The 2005 Menards IRL Infiniti Pro Series Season was the series' fourth. It consisted of 14 races and the champion was Wade Cunningham. It was the first IPS season to include road course races. All teams used Dallara chassis and Infiniti engines.

Race Summaries

Homestead-Miami 100
The Homestead-Miami 100 was held March 6 at Homestead-Miami Speedway. Travis Gregg won the pole.

Top 5 Results
 Travis Gregg
 Jaime Camara
 Jon Herb
 Wade Cunningham
 Jay Drake

Phoenix 100
The Phoenix 100 was held March 19 at Phoenix International Raceway. Travis Gregg won the pole.

Top 5 Results
 Jon Herb
 Chris Festa
 Wade Cunningham
 Arie Luyendyk Jr.
 Nick Bussell

Grand Prix of St. Petersburg
The Grand Prix of St. Petersburg was held April 3 on the Streets of St. Petersburg. This was the series' first race not held on an oval. Marco Andretti won the pole.

Top 5 Results
 Marco Andretti
 Wade Cunningham
 Nick Bussell
 Alfred Unser
 Arie Luyendyk Jr.

Futaba Freedom 100
The Futaba Freedom 100 was held May 27 at the Indianapolis Motor Speedway. Jaime Camara won the pole.

Top 5 Results
 Jaime Camara
 Wade Cunningham
 Jay Drake
 Alfred Unser
 Marty Roth

Firestone 100
The Firestone 100 was held June 11 at Texas Motor Speedway. Travis Gregg won the pole.

Top 5 Results
 Travis Gregg
 Wade Cunningham
 Chris Festa
 Jay Drake
 Nick Bussell

Liberty Challenge
The inaugural Liberty Challenge was held June 18 on the Indianapolis Motor Speedway road course as a support race to the United States Grand Prix. It was the first IPS event that was not run in conjunction with an IRL race. Marco Andretti won the pole.

Top 5 Results
 Marco Andretti
 Wade Cunningham
 Chris Festa
 Nick Bussell
 Jaime Camara

Cleanevent 100
The Cleanevent 100 was held July 16 at Nashville Superspeedway. Jaime Camara won the pole.

Top 5 Results
 Jaime Camara
 Jeff Simmons
 Jay Drake
 Wade Cunningham
 Nick Bussell

Milwaukee 100
The Milwaukee 100 was held July 24 at the Milwaukee Mile. Jaime Camara won the pole.

Top 5 Results
 Jeff Simmons
 Wade Cunningham
 Nick Bussell
 Jon Herb
 Jaime Camara

Bluegrass 100
The Bluegrass 100 was held August 13 at Kentucky Speedway. Travis Gregg won the pole.

Top 5 Results
 Travis Gregg
 Wade Cunningham
 Marco Andretti
 Jay Drake
 Jeff Simmons

Pikes Peak 100
The Pikes Peak 100 was held August 21 at Pikes Peak International Raceway. Travis Gregg won the pole.

Top 5 Results
 Jeff Simmons
 Nick Bussell
 Travis Gregg
 Tom Wood
 Wade Cunningham

Sonoma 100
The Sonoma 100 was held August 28 at Infineon Raceway. Marco Andretti won the pole.

Top 5 Results
 Marco Andretti
 Wade Cunningham
 Jeff Simmons
 Nick Bussell
 Chris Festa

Chicagoland 100
The Chicagoland 100 was held September 11 at Chicagoland Speedway. Sarah McCune won the pole.

Top 5 Results
 Jeff Simmons
 Marty Roth
 Nick Bussell
 Jon Herb
 Travis Gregg

Corning 100
The Corning 100 was held September 25 at Watkins Glen International. Wade Cunningham won the pole.

Top 5 Results
 Jeff Simmons
 Marco Andretti
 Wade Cunningham
 Chris Festa
 Nick Bussell

California 100
The California 100 was held October 16 at the California Speedway. Travis Gregg won the pole.

Top 5 Results
 Wade Cunningham
 Jeff Simmons
 Travis Gregg
 Chris Festa
 Nick Bussell

Final standings

References

Indy Lights seasons
Indy Pro Series
Infiniti Pro Series